Farnborough International Airshow Radio is the official radio station of the Farnborough International Airshow, and has been part of the airshow's official media outlets for over twenty years.  The station was last run by media professionals Fred Marden and Paul Hutton. A significant dimension to the project is the contribution from media students from the nearby Farnborough College of Technology.

History
The station is overseen by Farnborough International Limited, a wholly owned subsidiary of British aerospace industry's body ADS.

The first radio station was set up to coincide with the September 1994 show, in partnership with Farnborough College of Technology. From 2000 the radio station was managed by the College's media department, led by broadcaster and media tutor Fred Marden.

The station works closely with Flight International and the Flight Daily News, and often features guest presenters from both publications.

2016 Broadcast
The scale of the station has increased vastly, and for the first time the 2016 official radio station for Farnborough International was broadcast on DAB alongside FM analogue, reaching a potential audience of 3.8 million in the south east of England. Broadcasting 9 days in total, the station was live from 0700-2100 during the week of the airshow with overnight highlights from the days events. As well as broadcasting a number of programmes across the day bringing interviews, traffic updates and competitions, the station also re-broadcast the air display commentary by Stratton Richey.

See also
 List of radio stations in the United Kingdom
 Annette Rizzo, Corporate Voice Overs Website
 Farnborough College of Technology
 Farnborough International Ltd
 Farnborough Airshow Radio

Radio stations in Hampshire
Radio stations established in 1996
Farnborough, Hampshire